Old universities can mean:
The seven ancient universities of Britain established before 1600
British universities that were universities before polytechnics became universities in 1992